William Bernau (born November 11, 1964) is a former American politician.

William Bernau was born in Charles City, Iowa to parents Gary and Patricia Bernau on November 11, 1964. Upon graduating from Charles City High School, Bernau enrolled at North Iowa Area Community College, and subsequently earned a Bachelor of Science degree in public service and administration from Iowa State University in 1987. He worked as a political consultant. In 1990, Bernau won his first term as a member of the Iowa House of Representatives and was seated as the legislator from District 73. He won reelection thrice thereafter, all from District 62.

References

Living people
1964 births
Democratic Party members of the Iowa House of Representatives
Iowa State University alumni
20th-century American politicians